Horchata, or , is a name given to various beverages, which are generally plant-based, but sometimes contain animal milk. In Spain, it is made with soaked, ground, and sweetened tiger nuts. In Latin America and other parts of the Americas, the base is jicaro, melon or sesame seeds, or white rice, along with other spices. Different varieties can be served hot or cold, and may be used as a flavor in other beverages, such as frappé coffee.

Etymology
The Italian and Maltese , the French and English orgeat have the same origin, although the beverages themselves have diverged, and are generally no longer made from barley.

History and composition

The drink originated in North Africa, and it is estimated that during the 11th century, it began to spread throughout Hispania (now Spain and Portugal). There are 13th-century records of a -like beverage made near Valencia, where it remains a common drink.

From Spain, the concept of horchata was brought to the New World. Here, drinks called  or simply  came to be made with white rice and cinnamon or  instead of tiger nuts. Sometimes these drinks had vanilla added, or were served adorned with fruit.

Varieties

or 

It is made from soaked, ground and sweetened tiger nuts. According to researchers at the University of Ilorin,  made from tiger nuts is an inexpensive source of protein.

This form of horchata is now properly called .

It remains popular in Spain, where a regulating council exists to ensure the quality and traceability of the product in relation to the designation of origin. There it is served ice-cold as a natural refreshment in the summer, often served with fartons.

Alboraya is the most important production centre. In total, sixteen Valencian municipalities grow tiger nuts protected by the quality seal, the only one that guarantees its Valencian origin, which in aggregate cover around 485 hectares of tiger nut fields, with an approximate annual production of 8,000 tonnes, which is normally all sold by the time it is harvested. 

(es) is made of rice, sometimes with vanilla and typically with cinnamon.

In Alvarado,  is scented with flowers of the Aztec marigold ( or Tagetes erecta).

Though  was once typically homemade, it is now available in both ready-to-drink (shelf-stable or refrigerated) and powdered form in grocery stores, principally in the U.S. and Latin America.

("sesame horchata") is made with toasted ground sesame seeds. In Puerto Rico, it is typically made by pouring boiling water over  sesame seeds and left to soak 24 hours. It is then strained adding sugar, vanilla, and cinnamon. Evaporated milk, coconut milk, and rum can be added.

 is also made with sesame seeds, water and sugar in Zulia, an area in the west of Venezuela.

is made of ground melon seeds.

Its base is made from grinding jicaro seeds, also locally referred to as "morro" seeds, with rice. Depending on the region, other additions include ground cocoa, cinnamon, sesame seeds, nutmeg, tiger nuts, vanilla, ground peanuts, almonds and cashews.

In Nicaragua, it is made with semilla de jicaro and rice as a base. They are toasted and then ground into a fine powder. The powder is then mixed with water or milk and mixed with cinnamon powder and sugar. Cocoa beans are sometimes added to the horchata, also toasted and ground with the base.

Ecuadorian 
In Ecuador,  is a clear red infusion or tea of 18 herbs, and is most famous in the province of Loja. Some of the herbs used are escancel or bloodleaf, lemon verbena, lemon grass, mint, chamomile, lemon balm, rose geranium, among others. It is not at all related to horchata of other Latin American countries, it simply shares the same denomination.

The urban and rural people who consume the “horchata” drink in the Loja province report wellbeing benefits, and believe that this herbal mixture infusion promotes a healthy digestion, improves memory, and acts as an hepatic anti-inflammatory and a diuretic. There is also genotoxic activity in some of its ingredients.

as a flavor

Horchata, as a flavor, makes appearances in ice cream, cookies, and other sweets, and other products such as RumChata, an alcoholic tribute to the beverage. Some smoothie shops, cafés, and McDonald's in the U.S. have been experimenting with horchata-flavored frappes.

See also
 Chicha
 Orgeat syrup
 Rice milk
 Salep

References

External links

 The Regulating Council of Denomination of Origin "Chufa de Valencia": Quality council regulating tiger nut horchata in Valencia
 Article about Horxata, Ltd.: Valencian Horchata in New York City

Aguas frescas
Mexican drinks
Non-alcoholic drinks
Plant milk
Rice drinks
Spanish drinks